The Groove Cubed is the third studio album by American jazz and funk group Rock Candy Funk Party. It was released on October 20, 2017, through J&R Adventures. The album features Ty Taylor from Vintage Trouble and Mahalia Barnes as guest vocalists.

Track listing 
All tracks written by Tal Bergman / Joe Bonamassa / Ron DeJesus / Michael Merritt unless indicated.

References

2017 albums
Rock Candy Funk Party albums